Saidabad Rural District may refer to:
 Saidabad Rural District (Ijrud County), Zanjan province
 Saidabad Rural District (Pardis County), Tehran province
 Saidabad Rural District (Savojbolagh County), Alborz province
 Saidabad Rural District (Shahriar County), Tehran province